Ficus repens can refer to:

Ficus repens Rottler, a synonym of Ficus heterophylla L.f.
Ficus repens Roxb. ex Willd., a synonym of Ficus assamica Miq.